Kristen Michelle Newlin (born May 8, 1985)  Nevin Nevlin is a Turkish American basketball player at the center position who plays for Fenerbahçe Istanbul. Born in Kailua, Hawaii she is 1.96 m and her primary position is center. Nevlin became a valuable member of a EuroLeague Women side of Fenerbahçe Istanbul. Although she is known with her size, Kristen Nevlin is a very good mid-range shooter, a good rebounder in the low post, she has been flirting with WNBA teams for two years.

She acquired Turkish citizenship in 2008 and consequently adopted the Turkish name of Nevin. She played first times for Turkey against Serbia and she scored 7 points in 23 minutes.

On 10 January 2009 she played for Turkish Women's Basketball League All-Star match.

High school years 
She played for Riverton High School in Riverton, Wyoming.

College years 
She played for Stanford University in the NCAA with 5,6 ppg, 5,2 rpg (2003–04), 8,2 ppg, 5,0 rpg (2004–05), 8,3 ppg, 6,8 rpg (2005–06) and 7,0 ppg, 7,9 rpg (2005–06).

Stanford  statistics
Source

WNBA career 
She drafted 34th overall for Houston Comets in the 2007 WNBA Draft but however on 10 May 2007, she signed a contract with the Indiana Fever.

Europe career 
 2007–08  Botaş Spor
 2008–...  Fenerbahçe Istanbul
Turkish Championship: 2008, 2009, 2010, 2011, 2012, 2013
Turkish Cup: 2008, 2009
Turkish Presidents Cup: 2010

International career 
Newlin plays for Turkey women's national basketball team.

Personal life
Newlin's brother is Brett Newlin, an American rower who won silver in the 2005 World Rowing Championships and competed in the 2008 and 2012 Summer Olympics.

See also
 Turkish women in sports

References

External links 
Player Profile on fenerbahce.org
Player profil on fibaeurope.com
Player Profile on wnba.com

1985 births
Living people
American emigrants to Turkey
American women's basketball players
American people of Turkish descent
Basketball players from Hawaii
Basketball players from Wyoming
Botaş SK players
Centers (basketball)
Fenerbahçe women's basketball players
Naturalized citizens of Turkey
People from Hawaii (island)
People from Riverton, Wyoming
Stanford Cardinal women's basketball players
Turkish people of American descent
Turkish women's basketball players